William Docherty Jr. (March 5, 1915 – October 27, 1972) was an American football player and coach of football and baseball. He served as the head football coach at Haverford College from 1963 to 1966. Docherty was also the head baseball coach at Haverford in 1943 and 1960.

References

External links
 

1915 births
1972 deaths
American football tackles
Haverford Fords baseball coaches
Haverford Fords football coaches
Temple Owls football players
Players of American football from New York City